Thérèse Leduc (25 January 1934 – 4 October 1988) was a French alpine skier. She competed in three events at the 1960 Winter Olympics.

References

External links
 

1934 births
1988 deaths
French female alpine skiers
Olympic alpine skiers of France
Alpine skiers at the 1960 Winter Olympics
Sportspeople from Vosges (department)